The 2002–03 season was Morelia's 53rd season in existence and their 22nd consecutive season in the top flight of Mexican football. The club participated in the Apertura and Clausura tournaments of the Mexican Primera División and in the 2003 CONCACAF Champions' Cup (the entire tournament, except for the finals, were played on the first semester of 2003).

Monarcas Morelia had a partially successful season. They achieved to reach both Apertura and Clausura tournaments' finals, but lost them both. They were defeated by Toluca in the Apertura tournament final and lost the Clausura tournament to Monterrey, despite ending the regular tournament as leaders of the championship.

Internationally, Morelia classified to the CONCACAF Champion's Cup final, that would be played on the team's next season.

Players

Apertura

Clausura

Transfers

In

Out

Competitions

Overview

1. Morelia qualified to the 2003 CONCACAF Champions' Cup final, to be played on the next season.

Torneo Apertura

League table

Matches

Playoffs

Quarterfinals

Semifinals

Final

Torneo Clausura

League table

Matches

Playoffs

Quarterfinals

Semifinals

Final

CONCACAF Champions' Cup

Knockout phase

Round of 16

Quarterfinals

Semifinals

Statistics

Appearances and goals

Goalscorers

Hat-tricks

Own goals

Notes

A.  Morelia classified to the 2003 CONCACAF Champions' Cup final, to be played on the team's next season.

References

Mexican football clubs 2002–03 season
Atlético Morelia seasons